This is a list of historians only for those with a biographical entry in Wikipedia. Major chroniclers and annalists are included. Names are listed by the person's historical period. The entries continue with the specializations, not nationality.

Antiquity

Greco-Roman world

Classical period
Herodotus (484 – c. 420 BCE), Halicarnassus, wrote the Histories, which established Western historiography
Thucydides (460 – c. 400 BCE), Peloponnesian War
Xenophon (431 – c. 360 BCE), Athenian knight and student of Socrates
Ctesias (early 4th century BCE), Greek historian of Assyrian, Persian, and Indian history

Hellenistic period
Ephorus of Cyme (c. 400–330 BCE), Greek history
Theopompus (c. 380 – c. 315 BCE), Greek history
Eudemus of Rhodes (c. 370 – c. 300 BCE), Greek historian of science
Ptolemy I Soter (367 – c. 283 BCE), general of Alexander the Great, founder of the Ptolemaic dynasty
Duris of Samos (c. 350 – post-281 BCE), Greek history
Berossus (early 3rd century BCE), Babylonian historian
Timaeus of Tauromenium (c. 345 BCE – c. 250 BCE), Greek history
Manetho (3rd century BCE), Egyptian historian and priest from Sebennytos (ancient Egyptian: Tjebnutjer) living in the Ptolemaic era
Quintus Fabius Pictor (born c. 254 BCE), Roman history
Artapanus of Alexandria (late 3rd – early 2nd centuries BCE), Jewish historian of Ptolemaic Egypt
Cato the Elder (234–149 BCE), Roman statesman and historian, author of the Origines
Cincius Alimentus (late 2nd century BCE), Roman history
Gaius Acilius, Roman history
Agatharchides (fl. mid–2nd century BCE), Greek history
Polybius (203 – c. 120 BCE), early Roman history (in Greek)
Sempronius Asellio (c. 158 – post-91 BCE), early Roman history
Valerius Antias (1st century BCE), Roman history
Quintus Claudius Quadrigarius (1st century BCE), Roman history
Diodorus of Sicily (1st century BCE), Greek history
Posidonius (c. 135 – 51 BCE), Greek and Roman history
Theophanes of Mytilene (fl. mid 1st-century BCE), Roman history

Roman Empire
Julius Caesar (100 – c. 44 BCE), Gallic and civil wars
Sallust (86–34 BCE), Roman history
Dionysius of Halicarnassus (c. 60 – post-7 BCE), Roman history
Livy (c. 59 BCE – c. 17 CE), Roman history
Memnon of Heraclea, Greek and Roman history
Strabo (63 BCE – 24 CE), geography, Greek history
Marcus Velleius Paterculus (c. 19 BCE – c. 31 CE), Roman history
Claudius (10 BCE – 54 CE), Roman, Etruscan and Carthaginian history
Pamphile of Epidaurus (female historian active under Nero, r. 54–68), Greek history
Marcus Cluvius Rufus, (fl. 41–69), Roman history
Quintus Curtius Rufus (c. 60–70), Greek history
Flavius Josephus (37–100), Jewish history
Dio Chrysostom (c. 40 – c. 115 CE), history of the Getae
Thallus (early 2nd c. CE), Roman history
Gaius Cornelius Tacitus (c. 56–120), early Roman Empire
Plutarch (c. 46–120), Parallel Lives of important Greeks and Romans
Criton of Heraclea (fl. 100), history of the Getae and the Dacian Wars
Suetonius (c. 69 – post-122), Roman emperors up to the Flavian dynasty
Appian (c. 95 – c. 165), Roman history
Arrian (c. 92–175), Greek history
Granius Licinianus (2nd century), Roman history
Criton of Pieria (2nd century), Greek history
Lucius Ampelius (c. 2nd c. CE), Roman history
Dio Cassius (c. 160 – post-229), Roman history
Marius Maximus (c. 160 – c. 230), biography of Roman emperors
Diogenes Laërtius (fl. c. 230), history of Greek philosophers
Sextus Julius Africanus (c. 160 – c. 240), early Christian
Herodian (c. 170 – c. 240), Roman history
Publius Anteius Antiochus (early 3rd c.)
Gaius Asinius Quadratus (fl. 248), Roman history
Dexippus (c. 210 – 273), Roman history
Ephorus the Younger (late 3rd century), Roman history
Acholius (late 3rd century), Roman history
Callinicus (died 273), history of Alexandria
Eusebius of Caesarea (c. 275 – c. 339), early Christian
Praxagoras of Athens (fl. early 4th century), Greek and Roman history
Festus (fl. 370), Roman history
Aurelius Victor (c. 320 – c. 390), Roman history
Eutropius (died 390), Roman history
Ammianus Marcellinus (c. 325 – c. 391), Roman history
Virius Nicomachus Flavianus (334–394), Roman history
Sulpicius Alexander (fl. late 4th century), Roman history
Rufinus of Aquileia (c. 340–410), early Christian
Eunapius (346–414), biographies of philosophers and universal history
Orosius (c. 375 – post-418), early Christian
Philostorgius (368 – c. 439), early Christian
Socrates of Constantinople (c. 380 – unknown date), early Christian
Agathangelos (5th century), Armenian history
Priscus (5th century), Byzantine history
Sozomen (c. 400 – c. 450), early Christian
Theodoret (c. 393 – c. 457), early Christian
Movses Khorenatsi (13 January 410–488), Armenian history
Hydatius (c. 400 – c. 469), chronicler of Hispania
Salvian (c. 400/405 – c. 493), early Christian
Faustus of Byzantium (5th c.), Armenian history
Ghazar Parpetsi (441/443–510/515), Armenian history
Zosimus (fl. 491–518), late Roman history
Jordanes (6th century), history of the Goths
John Malalas (c. 491–578), Early Christian

China

Zuo Qiuming (左丘明, 556–451 BCE), attributed author of Zuo zhuan, history of Spring and Autumn period
Sima Tan (司馬談, 165–110 BCE), historian and father of Sima Qian, who completed his Records of the Grand Historian
Sima Qian (司馬遷, c. 145 – c. 86 BCE), founder of Chinese historiography, compiled Records of the Grand Historian (though preceded by Book of Documents and Zuo zhuan)
Liu Xiang (劉向, 77–76 BCE) (Chinese Han dynasty), Chinese history
Ban Biao (班彪, CE 3–54) (Chinese Han dynasty), the Book of Han, completed by son and daughter
Ban Gu (班固, CE 32–92) (Chinese Han dynasty), Chinese history
Ban Zhao (班昭, CE 45–116) (Chinese Han dynasty, China's first female historian)
Chen Shou (陈寿, 233–297) (Chinese Jin dynasty) compiled Records of the Three kingdoms
Faxian (法顯, c. 337 – c. 422), Chinese Buddhist monk and historian
Fan Ye (范曄, 398–445), Chinese history, compiled the Book of Later Han
Shen Yue (沈約, 441–513), Chinese history of the Liu Song dynasty (420–479)

Middle Ages

Byzantine sphere

Procopius (c. 500 – c. 565), writings on reigns of Justinian and Theodora
Constantine of Preslav (late 9th – early 10th c.), Bulgarian historian
Nestor the Chronicler (c. 1056 – c. 1114, in Kiev), author of the Primary Chronicle
Anna Komnene (1083–1153), Byzantine princess 
Joannes Zonaras (12th c.), Byzantine chronicler
Nicetas Choniates (died c. 1220)
Domentijan (1210–1264), Serbian monk and chronicler

Latin sphere

Early Middle Ages
Gregory of Tours (538–594), A History of the Franks
Baudovinia, Frankish nun who wrote a biography of Radegund
Cogitosus (fl. c. 650), Irish historian
Tírechán (fl. c. 655), Irish biographer of Saint Patrick
Muirchu moccu Machtheni (7th c.), Irish historian
Adamnan (625–704), Irish historian
Bede (c. 672–735), Anglo-Saxon England
Paul the Deacon (8th c.), Langobards
Einhard (9th c.), biographer of Charlemagne
Nennius (c. 9th c.), Wales
Notker of St Gall (9th c.), anecdotal biography of Charlemagne
Martianus Hiberniensis (819–875), Irish teacher and historian
Asser, Bishop of Sherborne (died 908/909), Welsh historian
Regino of Prüm (died 915)

High Middle Ages

10th century
Widukind of Corvey (925–973), Ottonian chronicler
Liutprand of Cremona (922–972), Byzantine affairs
Heriger of Lobbes (925–1007), theologian and historian
Richerus, French monk and historian

11th century
Thietmar of Merseburg (25 July 975 – 1 December 1018), German, Polish, and Russian affairs
Michael Psellus (1018 – c. 1078), Greek politician and historian
Marianus Scotus (1028–1082/1083), Irish chronicler
Michael Attaleiates (c. 1015 – c. 1080), Byzantine historian
Guibert of Nogent (1053–1124), Benedictine historian
Eadmer (c. 1066 – c. 1124), post-Conquest English history
Adam of Bremen (later 11th century), historian of Scandinavia, Gesta Hammaburgensis Ecclesiae Pontificum

12th century
In alphabetical order:
Albert of Aix, historian of the First Crusade
Alured of Beverley (fl. 1143), English chronicler
Ambroise (fl. 1190s), Anglo-Norman writer of verse narrative of the Third Crusade
Anna Komnene (Anna Comnena, 1083 – post-1148), Byzantine princess and historian
Bele Regis Notarius(late 12th century – early 13th century),Hungarian chronicler. Gesta Hungarorum.
Florence of Worcester (died 1118), English chronicler
Galbert of Bruges (12th century), Flemish chronicler
Gallus Anonymus (fl. 11th – 12th centuries), Polish historian
Geoffrey Gaimar (fl. 1130s), Anglo-Norman chronicler
Geoffrey of Monmouth (c. 1100 – c. 1155), churchman/historian
Geoffroi de Villehardouin (c. 1160–1212)
Helmold of Bosau (ca. 1120 – post-1177), German chronicler
John of Worcester (fl. 1150s), English chronicler
Otto of Freising (c. 1114–1158), German chronicler
Pelagius of Oviedo (died 1153), Iberian bishop/historian
Saxo Grammaticus (12th century), Danish chronicler
Svend Aagesen (c. 1140/1150 – unknown date), Danish historian
Symeon of Durham (died post-1129), English chronicler
William of Malmesbury (1095–1143), English historian
William of Newburgh (1135–1198), English historian known as "the father of historical criticism"
William of Tyre (c. 1128–1186)

13th century
Giraldus Cambrensis (c. 1146 – c. 1223)
Wincenty Kadlubek (1161–1223), Polish historian
Adam of Eynsham (died c. 1233), English hagiographer and writer, abbot of Eynsham Abbey
Snorri Sturluson (c. 1178–1241), Icelandic historian
Matthew Paris (died 1259), English chronicler and illuminator
Jans der Enikel (c. 1227 – c. 1290), Viennese historian and poet
Templar of Tyre (c. 1230–1314), end of the Crusades
Simon of Kéza. End of 13th century. A Hungarian chronicler. (c. 1282–1285: Gesta Hunnorum et Hungarorum)

Late Middle Ages
Historians of the Italian Renaissance listed under "Renaissance"
Piers Langtoft (died c. 1307)
Jean de Joinville (1224–1319)
Giovanni Villani (1276–1348), Italian chronicler from Florence who wrote the Nuova Cronica'
John of Küküllő (1320–1393)
John Clyn, Irish historian
Seán Mór Ó Dubhagáin (died 1372), Irish historian
Adhamh Ó Cianáin (died 1373)
John of Fordun (died 1384), Scottish chronicler
Ruaidhri Ó Cianáin (died 1387), Irish historian
Jean Froissart (c. 1337 – c. 1405), chronicler
Dietrich of Nieheim (c. 1345–1418), ecclesiastical history
Christine de Pizan (c. 1365 – c. 1430), historian, poet and philosopher
Álvar García de Santa María (1370–1460)
Giolla Íosa Mór Mac Fhirbhisigh (fl. 1390–1418)
John Capgrave (1393–1464)
Alfonso de Cartagena (1396–1456)
Enguerrand de Monstrelet (c. 1400–1453), French chronicler
Georges Chastellain (c. 1405 or 1415–1475), Burgundian chronicler
Thomas Basin (1412–1491), French historian
Jan Długosz (1415–1480), Polish historian and chronicler
Mathieu d'Escouchy (1420–1482), French chronicler
Olivier de la Marche (1425–1502), Burgundian chronicler
Antonio Bonfini(1424–1502), Italian chronicler
Johannes de Thurocz(1435–1489), Hungarian chronicler
Jean Molinet (1435–1507), French chronicler
Cathal Óg Mac Maghnusa (1439–1498), compiler and annalist
Philippe de Commines (1447–1511)

Islamic world

Ibn Rustah (10th century), Persian historian and traveler
Abu'l-Fadl Bayhaqi (995–1077), Persian historian and author
Muhammad ibn Jarir al-Tabari (838–923), Persian historian
Al-Biruni (973–1048), Persian historian
Ibn Hayyan (987–1075), Al-Andalus historian
Ibn Hazm (994–1064), Al-Andalus historian
Al-Udri (born 1003), Al-Andalus historian
Mohammed al-Baydhaq, Moroccan historian
Usamah ibn Munqidh (1095–1188)
Ali ibn al-Athir (1160–1233)
Abdelwahid al-Marrakushi (born 1185), Moroccan historian
Ibn al-Khabbaza (died 1239), Moroccan historian
Ata al-Mulk Juvayni (1226–1283), Persian historian
Abdelaziz al-Malzuzi (died 1298), Moroccan historian
Ibn Abi Zar (fl. 1315), Moroccan historian
Ibn Idhari (late 13th/early 14th c.), Moroccan historian
Rashid-al-Din Hamadani (1247–1317), Persian historian
Abdullah Wassaf (1299–1323), Persian historian
Ibn Khaldun (1332–1406), North African historian "of the world"
Ismail ibn al-Ahmar (1387–1406), Moroccan historian

Far East
Fang Xuanling (房玄齡, 579–648, Chinese Tang dynasty) compiled the Book of Jin.
Yao Silian (姚思廉, died 637, Chinese Tang dynasty) compiled the Book of Liang and Book of Chen.
Wei Zheng (魏徵, 580–643), Chinese historian and lead editor of the Book of SuiLiu Zhiji (劉知幾, 661–721), Chinese history, author of Shitong, the first Chinese work on Chinese historiography and methods
Ō no Yasumaro (太安万侶, died 723), Japanese chronicler and editor of Kojiki and Nihon ShokiLiu Xu (劉昫,888–947), Chinese historian and lead editor of Old Book of TangLi Fang (李昉, 925–996), Chinese editor of Four Great Books of SongSong Qi (宋祁, 998–1061), Chinese historian and co-author of New Book of TangOuyang Xiu (歐陽脩, 1007–1072), Chinese historian and co-author of New Book of TangSima Guang (司馬光, 1019–1086), Chinese historiographer and politician
Kim Bu-sik (김부식, 1075–1151), Korean historian, author of Samguk Sagi
Il-yeon (일연, 1206–1289), Korean historian, author of Samguk Yusa
Lê Văn Hưu (黎文休, 1230–1322), Vietnamese history
Toqto'a (脫脫, 1314–1356) (Chinese Yuan dynasty), Mongol historian who compiled History of SongSong Lian (宋濂, 1310–1381) (Chinese Ming dynasty), wrote History of YuanZhu Quan (朱權, 1378–1448), Chinese history

South Asia
Kalhana (c. 12th century), historian of Kashmir and Indian Subcontinent
Hemachandra (12th century), Jain polymath
Abdul Malik Isami (14th century), Indian historian and poet
Jonaraja (15th century) Kashmiri historian and Sanskrit poet
Padmanābha (15th century), Indian poet and historian
Yahya bin Ahmad Sirhindi (15th century), Delhi Sultanate

Renaissance to early modern
Renaissance EuropeWestern historians during the Italian Renaissance or Northern Renaissance; those born post-1600 listed under "early modern"Baldassarre Bonaiuti (1336–1385), chronicler and historian of the 14th century
Leonardo Bruni (1370–1444), humanist historian
Flavio Biondo (1392–1463), humanist historian
Philippe de Commines (1447–1511), French historian
Robert Fabyan (died 1513), London alderman and chronicler
Niccolò Machiavelli (1469–1527), author of Florentine HistoriesHector Boece (1465–1536), Scottish philosopher and historian, author of Historia Gentis ScotorumAlbert Krantz (1450–1517), German historian
Polydore Vergil (c. 1470–1555), Tudor history
Stephanus Brodericus (1480–1539), Croatian Hungarian bishop. Stephani Broderici narratio de praelio quo ad Mohatzium anno 1526 Ludovicus Hungariae rex periit(De conflictu Hungarorum cum Turcis ad Mohacz verissima historia) 
Francesco Guicciardini (1483–1540), historian of the Italian Wars, "Storia d'Italia"
Paolo Giovio (1486–1552), historian of the Italian Wars and the Renaissance Papacy, HistoriaePaolo Sarpi (1552–1623), historian of the Council of Trent
Olaus Magnus (c. 1490–1570), Swedish ecclesiastic
Kaspar Helth (1490–1574), Transylvanian Saxon historian and Protestant preacher. 
Nicolaus Olahus (1493–1568), Hungarian/Wallachian chronicler. H
João de Barros (1496–1570), Portuguese historian
Aegidius Tschudi (1505–1572), Swiss historian 
Oliver Mathews (c. 1520–c. 1618), Welsh chronicler
Josias Simmler (1530–1576), Swiss classicist
Ferenc Forgách, Bishop of Várad (1530–1577), Hungarian historian
Arild Huitfeldt (1546–1609), Denmark
Raphael Holinshed (died c. 1580), chronicler, source for Shakespeare plays
Caesar Baronius (1538–1607), ecclesiastical historian
Sigismund von Herberstein (1486–1566), Muscovite affairs
Miklós Istvánffy (1538–1615) Hungarian historian
Paolo Paruta (1540–1598), Venetian historian
Garcilaso de la Vega (1539–1616), Spanish historian of Inca history
Pilip Ballach Ó Duibhgeannáin. Irish historian

Early modern periodWestern historians of the Early modern and Enlightenment period, c. 1600–1815John Hayward (1564–1627)
James Ussher (1581–1656), chronology of the history of the world
Pieter Corneliszoon Hooft (1581–1647), Dutch Republic
William Bradford (1590–1657), Mayflower/Plymouth Colony of America
Mícheál Ó Cléirigh (c. 1590–1643), Irish historian
Thomas Fuller (1608–1661), English historian and churchman
Tadhg Óg Ó Cianáin (died c. 1614), Irish historian
Cú Choigcríche Ó Cléirigh (Peregrine O'Clery) (died c. 1662/1664), Irish historian
Sir James Ware (1594–1666), Anglo-Irish historian and antiquarian
Arthur Wilson (1595–1652), 16th-century Britain
Placido Puccinelli (1609–1685), Italian historian
Charles du Fresne, sieur du Cange (1610–1688), Medieval and Byzantine historian and philologist
Mary Bonaventure Browne (c. 1610 – c. 1670), Poor Clare and Irish historian
Peregrine Ó Duibhgeannain, Irish historian
Ruaidhrí Ó Flaithbheartaigh (1629–1716/1718), Irish historian
Louis-Sébastien Le Nain de Tillemont (1637–1698), ecclesiastical historian
Christoph Cellarius (1638–1707), German universal historian
John Strype (1643–1737), English historian
Thomas Rymer (c. 1643–1713), English historian and antiquary
Dubhaltach MacFhirbhisigh (fl. 1643–1671), Irish historian, annalist, genealogist
Geoffrey Keating/Seathrún Céitinn (died 1643), Irish historian
Đorđe Branković (1645–1711), Serbian history
Josiah Burchett (1666–1746), British naval historian and CEmiralty official
Laurence Echard (c. 1670–1730), England
Ludovico Antonio Muratori (1672–1750), Italy
Manuel Teles da Silva, 3rd Marquis of Alegrete (1682–1736), Portuguese historian
Matthias Bel (1684–1749), Lutheran pastor and polymath from Kingdom of Hungary
Moses Williams (1685–1742), Welsh scholar and antiquarian
Archibald Bower (1686–1766), historian of Rome
Vasily Tatishchev (1686–1750), first historian of modern Russia
Giambattista Vico (1688–1744), Italian historian, first modern philosopher of history
Voltaire (1694–1778), writer on Europe and France 
Johann Lorenz Von Mosheim (1694–1755), Lutheran historian
Charlotta Frölich (1698–1770), Swedish historian
Francis Blomefield (1705–1752), historian of Norfolk, England
David Hume (1711–1776), History of EnglandThomas Hutchinson (1711–1780), colonial Massachusetts
Francisco Jose Freire (1719–1773), Portuguese historian and philologist
William Robertson (1721–1793), Scottish historian
György Pray (1723–1801), Hungarian abbot and historian
Zaharije Orfelin (1726–1785), Austrian Serb historian
Johann Christoph Gatterer (1727–1799), German historian
Edward Hasted (1732–1812), English antiquarian and Kent historian
Mikhail Shcherbatov (1733–1790), Russian historian
August Ludwig von Schlözer (1735–1809), German historian
John Barrow (fl. 1735–1774), English naval historian and geographer 
Edward Gibbon (1737–1794), Roman Empire and Byzantium
Alexander Hewat (or Hewatt) (1739–1824), colonial Carolina and Georgia
Benjamin Incledon (1730–1796), English antiquary and school historian
Philip Yorke (1743–1804), Welsh historian and politician
Johann Gottfried Herder (1744–1803), philosophy of the history of mankind
Fray Íñigo Abbad y Lasierra (1745–1813), Spanish historian
David Ramsay (1749–1815), American Revolution; South Carolina
Johannes von Müller (1752–1809), Switzerland
Pauline de Lézardière (1754–1835), French law historian
Anton Tomaz Linhart (1756–1795), known for Slovenian history
Friedrich Schiller (1759–1805), German historian
Nikolai Mikhailovich Karamzin (1766–1826), Russian historian, Russian Empire
György Fejér (1766–1851) Hungarian author 
Francesco Maria Appendini (1768–1837), Italian historian, Republic of Ragusa
Ernst Moritz Arndt (1769–1860), German historian

Middle East and Islamic Empires

Abd al-Qadir Bada'uni (1540–1615), Indo-Persian historian
Ahmad Ibn al-Qadi (1553–1616), Moroccan historian
Abd al-Aziz al-Fishtali (1549–1621), Moroccan historian
Bahrey (born 1593), Ethiopian monk and historian; wrote Zenahu le Galla (History of the Galla, now the Oromo)
Abd al-Rahman al-Fasi (1631–1685), Moroccan historian
Mohammed al-Ifrani (1670–1745), Moroccan historian
Mohammed al-Qadiri (1712–1773), Moroccan historian
Abu al-Qasim al-Zayyani (1734–1833), Moroccan historian and poet
Sulayman al-Hawwat (1747–1816), Moroccan historian
Mohammed al-Duayf (born 1752), Moroccan historian
Abbasgulu Bakikhanov (1794–1847), history of Azerbaijan and the Middle East
George Grote (1794–1871), classical Greece
Teimuraz Bagrationi (1782–1846), history of Georgia and the Caucasus
Mohammed Akensus (1797–1877), Moroccan historian

Far East
Qian Qianyi (銭謙益, 1582–1664, late Chinese Ming dynasty)
Zhang Tingyu (張廷玉, 1672–1755, Chinese Qing dynasty) compiled the History of Ming.
Qian Daxin (錢大昕, 1728–1804, Chinese Qing dynasty)
Chang Hsüeh-ch'eng (章學誠, 1738–1801), Chinese historian, local histories and essays on historiography
Yu Deuk-gong (유득공, 1749–1807), Korean historian

Modern historians
Historians flourishing post-1815, born post-1770

In alphabetical order:
Lucy Aikin (1781–1864), English historical writer and biographer
Archibald Alison (1792–1867), English historian
Thomas Arnold (1795–1842), English historian and educator
Thomas Carlyle (1795–1881), French Revolution, Germany
Simonas Daukantas (1793–1864), Lithuanian
Charles Dezobry (1798–1871), French historian and historical novelist
John Colin Dunlop (c. 1785–1842), Scottish historian
George Finlay (1799–1875), Greece
Erik Gustaf Geijer (1783–1847), Swedish nationalist historian
François Guizot (1787–1874), French historian of general French, English history
Henry Hallam (1777–1859), Medieval European history
Georg Wilhelm Friedrich Hegel (1770–1831), German philosopher of history
Wilhelm von Humboldt (1767–1835), German historian and polymath
Joachim Lelewel (1786–1861), Polish historian
Heinrich Leo (1799–1878), Prussian historian
John Lingard (1771–1851), England
Louis Gabriel Michaud (1773–1858), French
Jules Michelet (1798–1874), French
François Mignet (1796–1884), French historian of the Revolution, Middle Ages
Christian Molbech (1783–1857), Danish history, founder of Historisk Tidsskrift (1839)
John Neal (1793–1876), US Revolutionary War and US literature
Barthold Georg Niebuhr (1776–1831), German historian
František Palacký (1798–1876), Czech
William H. Prescott (1796–1859), US historian of Spain, Mexico, Peru
Leopold von Ranke (1795–1886), European diplomacy; influential German historian
Adolphe Thiers (1797–1877), French historian of the Revolution, Empire
George Tucker (1775–1861), US history

Historians born in the 19th century

A
Lord Acton (1834–1902), Europe
Henry Adams (1838–1918), US 1800–1816
Lucia H. Faxon Additon (1847-1919), Oregon
Grace Aguilar (1816–1847), Jewish history
Robert G. Albion (1896–1983), maritime
Charles McLean Andrews (1863–1943), US; US colonial history
Marie Célestine Amélie d'Armaillé (1830-1918), France
Alfred von Arneth (1819–1897), history of the Austrian Empire
Mikhail Artamonov (1898–1972), founder of Khazar studies
William Ashley (1860–1927), British economic history
Octave Aubry (1881–1946)
François Victor Alphonse Aulard (1849–1928), French Revolution and Napoleon I
Zurab Avalishvili (1876–1944), history of Georgia and the Caucasus

B
Jacques Bainville (1879–1936), France
George Bancroft (1800–1891), US to 1789
Hubert Howe Bancroft (1832–1918), Native Americans and the Western United States
R. Mildred Barker (1897–1990), Shakers, religion
Harry Elmer Barnes (1889–1968), World War I; ideas
Wilhelm Barthold (1869–1930), Muslim and Turkic studies
Charles Bean (1879–1968), Australia in World War I
Charles A. Beard (1874–1948), US, economic interpretation, historiography
Mary Ritter Beard (1876–1958), US, women's history
Carl L. Becker (1873–1945), Enlightenment
Winthrop Pickard Bell (1884–1965), Nova Scotia
Hilaire Belloc (1870–1953), Europe
Ella A. Bigelow (1849–1917), Massachusetts, U.S.
Marc Bloch (1886–1944), medieval France; Annales School
Herbert Eugene Bolton (1870–1953), Spanish-US borderlands
Erich Brandenburg (1868–1946), Modern Germany
George Williams Brown (1894–1963), Canada
Otto Brunner (1898–1982), medieval and early modern Austria
Geoffrey Bruun (1899–1988), Europe
Arthur Bryant (1888–1985), Pepys; English warfare
 James Bryce, (1838-1922), Europe, America, Middle East
Henry Thomas Buckle (1821–1862), England, History of CivilizationJacob Burckhardt (1818–1897), art history, Europe, Renaissance
John Hill Burton (1809–1881), Scottish Jacobin history
J. B. Bury (1861–1927), classical, Europe

C
Helen Cam (1885–1968), English medieval
Pierre Caron (1875–1952), French revolution
E. H. Carr (1892–1982), Soviet history, methodology
Henri Raymond Casgrain (1831–1904), French Canada
Antonio Cánovas del Castillo (1828–1897), Spanish historian
Américo Castro (1885–1972), Spanish identity
Bruce Catton (1899–1978), American Civil War
Cesar de Bazancourt (1810–1865), Crimean War
Nirad C. Chaudhuri (1897–1999), India
Boris Chicherin (1828–1904), Russian historian, history of Russian law
Hiram M. Chittenden (1858–1917), US West, fur trade
Winston Churchill (1874–1965), world wars, British Empire
Augustin Cochin (1876–1916), French Revolution
Stephen F. Cohen (1938–2020), Russia
R. G. Collingwood (1889–1943), philosophy of history
Julian Corbett (1854–1922), British naval
Vladimir Ćorović (1885–1941), Serbia
Avery Craven (1885–1980), US South
Edward Shepherd Creasy (1812–1878), warfare
Benedetto Croce (1866–1952), historiography
Margaret Campbell Speke Cruwys (1894–1968), Devon 
John Shelton Curtiss (1899–1983), Soviet Union

D
Felix Dahn (1834–1912), medieval
Angie Debo (1890–1988), Native American and Oklahoma history
Léopold Delisle (1826–1910), French historian and librarian
Bernard DeVoto (1897–1955), US West
Margarita Diez-Colunje y Pombo (1838–1919), Colombia
William Dodd (1869–1940), US South
David C. Douglas (1898–1982), Norman England
Johann Gustav Droysen (1808–1884), German history
Sir George Dunbar (1878–1962), India
Ariel Durant (1898–1981), Europe
Will Durant (1885–1981), Europe

E
Norbert Elias (1897–1990), process of civilization
Ephraim Emerton (1851–1935), medieval Europe
Friedrich Engels (1820–1895), historical materialism

F
Cyril Falls (1888–1971), military, world wars
Lucien Febvre (1878–1956), France
Keith Feiling (1884–1977), England, conservatism 
Herbert Feis (1893–1972), World War II diplomacy, international finance
Charles Harding Firth (1857–1936), 17th-century England 
Herbert A. L. Fisher (1865–1940)
Walter Lynwood Fleming (1874–1932), US reconstruction
Vilmos Fraknói (27 February 1843 – 20 November 1924), a Hungarian historian and expert in Hungarian ecclesiastical history e. g. Popes and Hungarian kings diplomatic relations 
Edward Augustus Freeman (1823–1892), English politics
Egon Friedell (1878–1938), cultural history of the modern age
James Anthony Froude (1818–1894), Tudor England
J. F. C. Fuller (1878–1966), military
Frantz Funck-Brentano (1862–1947), France
John Sydenham Furnivall (1878–1960), Burma, Southeast Asia
Numa Denis Fustel de Coulanges (1830–1889), antiquity, France

G
François-Louis Ganshof (1895–1980), medieval history
Samuel Rawson Gardiner (1829–1902), 17th-century England
Alice Gardner (1854–1927), ancient history
Luise Gerbing (1855–1927), history of Thuringia
Pieter Geyl (1887–1966), Dutch
Lawrence Henry Gipson (1882–1970), British Empire before 1775
Arthur Giry (1848–1899), diplomacy
Gustave Glotz (1862–1935), Ancient Greece
George Peabody Gooch (1873–1968), modern diplomacy
Antonio Gramsci (1891–1937), political history
Timofey Granovsky (1813–1855), medieval Germany
Elizabeth Caroline Gray (1800–1887), Etruscan history
John Richard Green (1837–1883), English
Mary Anne Everett Green (1818–1895), English
Arthur Griffiths (1838–1908), military history
Lionel Groulx (1878–1967), Quebec
René Grousset (1885–1952), Oriental history

H
Élie Halévy (1870–1937), modern Britain
Louis Halphen (1880–1950), Middle Ages
Clarence H. Haring (1885–1960), Latin American history
B. H. Liddell Hart (1895–1970), military
Charles H. Haskins (1870–1937), medieval
Henri Hauser (1866–1946), French historian, economist, geographer
Julien Havet (1853–1893), Middle Ages
Paul Hazard (1878–1944), modern France
Eli Heckscher (1879–1954), Swedish economic historian
Auguste Himly (1823–1906), French historian and geographer
 Otto Hintze (1861–1940), Germany
Mihály Horváth (1809–1878), Hungary
Henry Hoyle Howorth (1842–1923), British historian and geologist
Mykhailo Hrushevsky (1866–1934), Ukrainian historian
Johan Huizinga (1872–1945), Dutch historian, author of Waning of the Middle AgesI
Ibn Zaydan (1873–1946), Moroccan historian
Dmitry Ilovaisky (1832–1920), Russian history
Marilla Baker Ingalls (US, 1828–1902), Burmese missionary and historian
Harold Innis (1894–1952), Canadian economic history

J
Mohammed ibn Jaafar al-Kattani (1858–1927), Moroccan
Muhammad Jaber (1875–1945), history of the Levant and the Middle-East
William James (1780–1827), historian of the Royal Navy during the Napoleonic Wars
Ivane Javakhishvili (1876–1940), Georgian historian
Arthur Johnson (1845–1927), historian at Oxford University
Ellen Jørgensen (1877–1948), Danish historian and historiographer

K
Samuel Kamakau (1815–1876), Hawaiian historian
Konstantin Kavelin (1818–1885), Russian historian, history of Russian laws
François Christophe Edmond de Kellermann (1802–1868), French political historian
Hans Kelsen (1881–1973), legal
Philip Moore Callow Kermode (1855–1932), Manx crosses and runic inscriptions
Alexander William Kinglake (1809–1891), works on the Crimean War
William Kingsford (1819–1898), Canadian
Vasily Klyuchevsky (1841–1911), Russian history
David Knowles (1896–1974), English medieval
Lilian Knowles (1870–1926), English economic historian
Dudley Wright Knox (1877–1960), US naval historian
Ludwig von Köchel (1800–1877), writer, botanist and music historian
Mihail Kogălniceanu (1817–1891), Romanian 
Hans Kohn (1891–1971), European nationalism
Nikodim Kondakov (1844–1925), Byzantine art
Mehmet Fuad Köprülü (1890–1966), Turkish historian
Mykola Kostomarov (1817–1885), Russian and Ukrainian history
Peter Kropotkin (1842–1921), economics, sociology and political history
Godefroid Kurth (1847–1916), Belgian historian

L
Leonard Woods Labaree (1897–1980), editor of the Benjamin Franklin papers
Harold Lamb (1892–1962), US
Karl Lamprecht (1856–1915), German art and economic history
William L. Langer (1896–1977), US historian, world and diplomatic history
John Knox Laughton (1830–1915), British naval historian
Ernest Lavisse (1842–1922), French history
William Edward Hartpole Lecky (1838–1903), England and Ireland
Georges Lefebvre (1874–1959), French Revolution
Elisabeth Lemke (1849–1925) German history
Anna Lewis (1885–1961), South-western US
Liang Qichao (梁啓超, 1873–1929), Chinese and Western history and historiography
John Edward Lloyd (1861–1947), Welshness
Ferdinand Lot (1866–1952), Middle Ages
Arthur Oncken Lovejoy (1873–1962), intellectual history
Arthur R. M. Lower (1889–1988), Canadian
György Lukács (1885–1971), history of literature, art history and philosophy of history

M
Thomas Macaulay (1800–1859), British
R. B. McCallum (1898–1973) British 
J. D. Mackie (1887–1978), Scottish
William Archibald Mackintosh (1895–1970), Canadian economic
Alfred Thayer Mahan (1840–1914), naval
Frederic William Maitland (1850–1906), English legal, medieval
Ramesh Chandra Majumdar (1888–1980), Indian history
J. A. R. Marriott (1859–1945), modern Britain and Europe
Karl Marx (1818–1883), European society and economy
Albert Mathiez (1874–1932), French Revolution
Franz Mehring (1846–1919), political history, history of philosophy
Friedrich Meinecke (1862–1954), German intellectual and cultural
Krste Misirkov (1874–1926), Macedonian historian and author
Auguste Molinier (1851–1904), Middle Ages
Theodor Mommsen (1817–1903), Roman Empire
Alfred Morel-Fatio (1850–1924), Spain
Samuel Eliot Morison (1887–1976), naval, American colonial
John Lothrop Motley (1814–1877), the Netherlands 
Lewis Mumford (1895–1988), cities 

N
Lewis Bernstein Namier (1888–1960), 18th-century British and 20th-century diplomatic history
Ahmad ibn Khalid al-Nasiri (1835–1897), Moroccan 
J. E. Neale (1890–1975), Elizabethan England
Allan Nevins (1890–1971), US political and business; Civil War; biography
A. P. Newton (1873–1942), British Empire
Stojan Novaković (1842–1915), Serbian

O
Charles Oman (1860–1946), 19th-century military
Herbert L. Osgood (1855–1918), American colonial

P
K. M. Panikkar (1895–1963), Indian historian
Cesare Paoli (1840–1902), Italian history
Gaston Paris (1839–1903), Middle Ages
Jane Marsh Parker (1836-1913), US history
Francis Parkman (1823–1893), colonial North America 
Herbert Paul (1853–1935), 19th-century UK 
Henry Francis Pelham (1846–1907), Roman
Samuel W. Pennypacker (1843–1916), Pennsylvania history
Dexter Perkins (1889–1984), US history
Ivy Pinchbeck (1898–1982), English women and children
Henri Pirenne (1862–1935), Belgian and medieval European history
Sergey Platonov (1860–1933), Russian
Mikhail Pokrovsky (1868–1932), economics and Soviet history 
Albert Pollard (1869–1948), Tudor England
Delia Lyman Porter (1858-1933), US history
Datto Vaman Potdar (1890–1979), Indian historian
Eileen Power (1889–1940), Middle Ages
F. M. Powicke (1879–1963, English medieval
H. F. M. Prescott (1896–1972), biographer of Mary I of England and medieval History

Q
Jules Quicherat (1814–1882), Middle Ages

R
William Pember Reeves (1857–1932), New Zealand
Pierre Renouvin (1893–1974), diplomatic historian
Herbert Richmond (1871–1946), British naval
James Riker (1822–1889), New York
B. H. Roberts (1857–1933), Mormon
James Harvey Robinson (1863–1936), European
Theodore Roosevelt (1858–1919), US west and naval history
John Holland Rose (1855–1942), modern Europe, Britain and France
Michael Rostovtzeff (1870–1952), ancient history
Hans Rothfels (1891–1976), modern German
Simon Rutar (1851–1903), Slovenian
Ilarion Ruvarac (1832–1905), Serbian

S
Abram L. Sachar (1899–1993), modern European history
Govind Sakharam Sardesai (1865–1959), Indian
Salamon Ferenc (1825–1892), Ottoman Hungary
Richard G. Salomon (1884–1966), medieval and church
Jadunath Sarkar (1870–1958), history of India
George Sarton (1884–1956), history of science
Gustave Schlumberger (1844–1929), French
Otto Seeck (1850–1921), German
John Robert Seeley (1834–1895), British Empire
J. Salwyn Schapiro (1879–1973), fascism
Arthur Schlesinger, Sr. (1888–1965) US social history
W. C. Sellar (1898–1951), co-author of 1066 and All ThatShin Chaeho (신채호, 1880–1936), Korean 
Adam Shortt (1859–1931), Canadian
Charlotte Fell Smith (1851–1937), English early modern
Goldwin Smith (1823–1910), British and Canadian
Justin Harvey Smith (1857–1930), Mexican–American War
Sergey Solovyov (1820–1879), Russian historian
Oswald Spengler (1880–1936), world; The Decline of the WestStanoje Stanojević (1874–1937), Serbia
Wickham Steed (1871–1956), Eastern Europe
Frank Stenton (1880–1967), English medieval
Doris Mary Stenton (1894–1971), English medieval
Floyd Benjamin Streeter (1888–1956), Kansas, American West
William Stubbs (1825–1902), English law
László Szalay (1813–1864) Hungarian historian

T
Hippolyte Taine (1828–1893), French Revolution
Frank Bigelow Tarbell (1853–1920), ancient art history
Yevgeny Tarle (1874–1955), Russian historian
A. Wyatt Tilby (1880–1948), Britain, The English People OverseasAlexis de Tocqueville (1805–1859), France
Zeki Velidi Togan (1890–1970), Turkic history
Zacharias Topelius (1818–1898)
Thomas Frederick Tout (1855–1929), England
Arnold J. Toynbee (1889–1975), world history, A Study of HistoryHeinrich Gotthard von Treitschke (1834–1896), German historian and nationalist
George Macaulay Trevelyan (1876–1962), British
Mikheil Tsereteli (1878–1965), Georgian historian
Frederick Jackson Turner (1861–1932), US frontier

U
Frank Underhill (1889–1971), Canadian

V
Alfred Vagts, (1892–1986), Germany, military
Paul Vinogradoff (1854–1925), medieval England

W
Annie Russell Wall (1835-1920), English historian
Spencer Walpole (1839–1907), English historian
Charles Webster (1886–1961), British diplomatic history
Curt Weibull (1886–1991), Swedish historian
Lauritz Weibull (1873–1960), Swedish historian
Spenser Wilkinson (1853–1937), Britain, military historian
Mary Wilhelmine Williams (1878–1944), Latin America
James A. Williamson (1886–1964), Britain, maritime historian and historian of exploration
Esmé Cecil Wingfield-Stratford (1882–1971), England
Justin Winsor (1831–1897), America, Narrative and Critical History of AmericaCarl Frederick Wittke (1892–1971), US ethnics
Ernest Llewellyn Woodward (1890–1971), British history and international relations
Muriel Hazel Wright (1889–1975), Oklahoma, Native Americans
George MacKinnon Wrong (1860–1948), Canadian

Y
Yi Byeongdo (이병도, 1896–1989), Korea

Z
Nicolas Zafra (1892–1979), Philippines
Johann Kaspar Zeuss (1806–1856), Celts
Faddei Zielinski (1859–1944), ancient Greece

Historians born in the 20th century 

A
Raouf Abbas (1939–2008), Egyptian
Irving Abella (1940–2022), Canadian
Aberjhani (born 1957), African American, Harlem Renaissance, Literary
David Abulafia (born 1949), Mediterranean 
Ezequiel Adamovsky (born 1971), Argentina	
Donald Adamson (born 1939), Britain
Teodoro Agoncillo (1912–1985), Philippines 
Donald Akenson (born 1941), Irish 
Dean C. Allard (1933–2018), US naval
Robert C. Allen (born 1947), British economy
Gar Alperovitz (born 1936), America, Hiroshima
Ida Altman (born 1950), America, colonial Spain and Latin America
Mor Altshuler (born 1957), Hasidism, Kabbalism, and Jewish messianism
Abbas Amanat (born 1947) Iran, America
Stephen Ambrose (1936–2002), World War II, U.S. political
Henri Amouroux (1920–2007), French, Nazi occupation of France
Perry Anderson (born 1938), British and European 
Joyce Appleby (1929–2016), U.S. early national
Herbert Aptheker (1915–2003), African-American 
Leonie Archer (born 1955), England
Philippe Ariès (1914–1984), French medieval, childhood
Karen Armstrong (born 1944), British religious
Andrea Aromatico (born 1966), Italian esotericism and Hermetic iconography
Leonard J. Arrington (1917–1999), America, Mormons
Thomas Asbridge (born 1969), Crusades
Maurice Ashley (1907–1994), 17th-century England
Paul Avrich (1931–2006), Russian, the Anarchist movement
Gerald Aylmer (1926–2000), 17th-century England
Ali Azaykou (1942–2004), Moroccan
Eiichiro Azuma (born 1966), US, Japan

B
Nigel Bagnall (1927–2002), Ancient Rome, Greece
Bernard Bailyn (1922–2020), early America; Atlantic
David E. Barclay (born 1948), German
Juliet Barker (born 1958), late Middle Ages, literary biography
Frank Barlow (1911–2009), medieval biography
Linda Diane Barnes (living), US
Geoffrey Barraclough (1908–1984), Germany, world
G.W.S. Barrow (1924–2013), Scotland
H. Arnold Barton (1929–2016), Scandinavia
Paul R. Bartrop (born 1955), Holocaust, genocide
Jacques Barzun (1907–2012), cultural
Jorge Basadre (1903–1980), Peru
Hanna Batatu (1926–2000), Palestinian, modern Iraq
K. Jack Bauer (1926–1987), U.S. naval, military, and maritime
Yehuda Bauer (born 1926), Holocaust
Stephen B. Baxter (1929–2020), late 17th – early 18th-century English
David Bebbington (born 1949), Evangelicalism
Antony Beevor (born 1946), World War II
David Bell (living), Early Modern France, cultural history
James Belich (born 1956), New Zealand
Abdelmajid Benjelloun (born 1944), Morocco
Laurence Bergreen (born 1950), biography
Isaiah Berlin (1909–1997), ideas
Michael Beschloss (born 1955), Cold War
Juliette Bessis, (1925–2017), Tunisia
Nicholas Bethell (1938–2007), Soviet
Robert Bickers (born 1964), modern China and colonialism
Anthony Birley (1937–2020), Ancient Rome
David Blackbourn (born 1949), German
Geoffrey Blainey (born 1930), Australian
Lesley Blanch (1904–2007), English
Gisela Bock (born 1942), German feminist
Brian Bond (born 1936), British military
Chrystelle Trump Bond (1938–2020), US dance historian
Daniel J. Boorstin (1914–2004), US
Georges Bordonove (1920–2007), France
John Boswell (1947–1994), medievalist
Robert Bothwell (born 1944), Canada
Gérard Bouchard (born 1943), Canada
Joanna Bourke (born 1963), military
Paul S. Boyer (1935–2012), US morality
Karl Dietrich Bracher (1922–2016), modern German
Jim Bradbury (born 1937), Middle Ages
James C. Bradford (born 1944), US naval
David Brading (born 1936), Mexican history
William Brandon (1914–2002), American West
Fernand Braudel (1902–1985), world, Mediterranean
Ahron Bregman (born 1958), Arab-Israeli conflict
Holly Brewer (born 1964), early American history
Carl Bridenbaugh (1903–1992), American colonial
Asa Briggs (1921–2016), British social history
Alan Brinkley (1949–2019), American 1930s
David Brody (born 1930), American labor
Timothy Brook (born 1951), China
Martin Broszat (1926–1989), Nazi Germany
Gregory S. Brown (living), Early Modern French History, Cultural History
Peter Brown (born 1935), medieval
Christopher Browning (born 1944), Holocaust
Sérgio Buarque de Holanda (1902–1982), Brazil
Alan Bullock (1914–2004), 1940s, Hitler studies
Peter Burke (born 1937), modern period, cultural history
Michael Burlingame (born 1941), Abraham Lincoln
Briton C. Busch (1936–2004), British diplomatic and US maritime
Richard Bushman (born 1931), US colonial and Mormon
Jon Butler (born 1940), US religion
Herbert Butterfield (1900–1979), historiography

C
Angus Calder (1942–2008), Second World War
Philip L. Cantelon (born 1940), United States 
Julio Caro Baroja (1914–1995), anthropologist
Sir Raymond Carr (1919–2015), Spain and Latin America
Richard Carrier (born 1969), ancient Rome; history of philosophy, science and religion
Paul Cartledge (born 1947), classicist
Lionel Casson (1914–2009), classicist
Boris Celovsky (1923–2008), Czech-German relations
David G. Chandler (1934–2004), British historian specializing in Napoleonic history
Bipan Chandra (1928–2014), modern India
Iris Chang (이병도, 1968–2004), China
Howard I. Chapelle (1901–1975), maritime
Maher Charif (living), Arabic intellectual history and political movements
Louis Chevalier (1911–2001), France
Alexander Campbell Cheyne (1924–2006), Scotland
Thomas Childers (born 1976), war and society, both world wars
Satyabrata Rai Chowdhuri (1935–2016), India
I. R. Christie (1919–1998), Britain
Robert M. Citino (born 1958), US military historian of Europe
Alan Clark (1928–1999), both world wars
Christopher Clark (born 1960), Prussia
J.C.D. Clark (born 1951), British
Manning Clark (1915–1991), Australia
Oliver Edmund Clubb (1901–1989), China
Yolande Cohen (born 1950), youth, women, Moroccan Jews
Patrick Collinson (1929–2011), Elizabethan England and Puritanism
Robert Conquest (1917–2015), Russia
Margaret Conrad (born 1946), Canada
John Milton Cooper (born 1940), Woodrow Wilson
Peter Cottrell (born 1964), Anglo-Irish
Gordon A. Craig (1913–2005), German and diplomatic
Donald Creighton (1902–1979), Canadian 
Vincent Cronin (1924–2011), European and art history
William Cronon (born 1954), US environmental
Pamela Kyle Crossley (born 1955), China
Roger Crowley (born 1951), Mediterranean Sea; Portuguese empire
Dan Cruickshank (born 1949), Britain, architecture
Robert M. Crunden (1940–1999), US cultural
Gemma Cruz (born 1943), Rizaliana, Philippines
Barry Cunliffe (born 1939), archaeology

D
Vahakn N. Dadrian (1926–2019), Armenia
Robert Dallek (born 1934), 20th-century US presidents
William Dalrymple (born 1965), Scottish
David B. Danbom (born 1947), US rural
Ahmad Hasan Dani (1920–2009), South Asia
Robert Darnton (born 1939), 18th-century France
Saul David (born 1966), military
John Davies (1938–2015), Wales
Norman Davies (born 1939), Poland, Britain
Kenneth S. Davis (1912–1999), Franklin D. Roosevelt
Natalie Zemon Davis (born 1928), early modern France, film
R. H. C. Davis (1918–1991), Middle Ages
Lucy Dawidowicz (1915–1990), Holocaust
David Day (born 1949), Australia
Renzo De Felice (1929–1996), Italian fascism
Carl N. Degler (1921–2014), US
Len Deighton (born 1929), British military
Esther Delisle (born 1954), French-Canadian
Jean Delumeau (1923–2020), Catholic Church
Marcel Detienne (1935–2019), ancient Greece
Alexandre Deulofeu (1903–1978), Catalan
Isaac Deutscher (1907–1967), Soviet
Wu Di (吴迪, born 1951), China
Igor M. Diakonov (1914–1999), Ancient Near East
David Herbert Donald (1920–2009), American Civil War
Gordon Donaldson (1913–1993), Scotland
Susan Doran (living), Elizabethan England
William Doyle (born 1932), French Revolution 
Georges Duby (1924–1996), Middle Ages
William S. Dudley (born 1936), US naval
Robert Dudley Edwards (1909–1988), Ireland
Eamon Duffy (born 1947), 15th–17th-century religious
Hermann Walther von der Dunk (1928–2018), 20th-century Dutch and German
Mary Maples Dunn (1931–2017), early American, women's history
Richard Slator Dunn (1928–2022), early American, slavery
A. Hunter Dupree (1921–2019), US science and technology
Trevor Dupuy (1916–1995), military
Jean-Baptiste Duroselle (1917–1994), French diplomacy
Harold James Dyos (1921–1978), British urban

E
Elizabeth Eisenstein (1923–2016), French Revolution, printing
Geoff Eley (born 1949), German
John Elliott (1930–2022), Spanish
Joseph J. Ellis (born 1943), early US
Geoffrey Elton (1921–1994), Tudor England
Peter Englund (born 1957), Sweden
Robert Malcolm Errington (born 1939), Britain
Richard J. Evans (born 1947), German social
Alf Evers (1905–2004), America

F
Esther Farbstein (born 1946), Israeli, Holocaust
Grahame Farr (1912–1983), maritime, south-west England
Brian Farrell (1929–2014), Ireland
Boris Fausto (born 1930), Brazil
John Lister Illingworth Fennell (1918–1992), medieval Russia
Niall Ferguson (born 1964), military, business, imperial
Božidar Ferjančić (1929–1998), medieval
Robert H. Ferrell (1921–2018), US history, US presidency, World War I, US foreign policy and diplomacy, Harry S. Truman
Marc Ferro (1924–2021), World War I
Joachim Fest (1926–2006), Nazi Germany
David Feuerwerker (1912–1980), Jewish
Heinrich Fichtenau (1912–2000), medieval, diplomacy
David Kenneth Fieldhouse (1925–2018), British Empire
Orlando Figes (born 1957), Russian
Robert O. Fink (1905–1988), classical
Moses Finley (1912–1986), ancient, especially economic
David Hackett Fischer (born 1935), American Revolution, cycles
Fritz Fischer (1908–1999), Germany
Frances FitzGerald (born 1940), Vietnam, history textbooks
Judith Flanders (born 1959), Victorian British social
Robin Fleming (born 1950s), medieval Britain
Robert Fogel (1926–2013), US economic, cliometrics
Eric Foner (born 1943), Reconstruction
Shelby Foote (1916–2005), American Civil War
Amanda Foreman (born 1968), Georgian England, American Civil War, women's history
Michel Foucault (1926–1984), ideas
Jo Fox (living), 20th-century film and propaganda
Robin Lane Fox (born 1946), ancient
Stephen Fox (born 1938), US in World War II
Elizabeth Fox-Genovese (1941–2007), US South, cultural and social, women
Walter Frank (1905–1945), Nazi historian
H. Bruce Franklin (born 1934), Vietnam War
Antonia Fraser (born 1932), England
Frank Freidel (1916–1993), Franklin Roosevelt
Joseph Friedenson (1922–2013), Holocaust
Henry Friedlander (1930–2012), Holocaust
Saul Friedländer (born 1932), Holocaust
Sheppard Frere (1916–2015), anthropologist, Roman Empire
David Fromkin (1932–2017), Middle East
Francis Fukuyama (born 1955), world
Bruno Fuligni (born 1968), French history
François Furet (1927–1997), French Revolution
Halima Ferhat (born 1941), Middle Ages of the Maghreb

G
Femme Gaastra (born 1945), Dutch
John Lewis Gaddis (born 1941), Cold War
Lloyd Gardner (born 1934), US diplomatic
Delphine Gardey (born 1967, gender and science)
Edwin Gaustad (1923–2011), religion in America
Peter Gay (1923–2015), psycho-history, Enlightenment and 19th-century social
Eugene Genovese (1930–2012), US South, slavery
Imanuel Geiss (1931–2012), 19th/20th-century Germany
François Géré (born 1950), military
Christian Gerlach (born 1963), Holocaust
N.H. Gibbs (1910–1990), military
William Gibson (born 1959), ecclesiastical history
Martin Gilbert (1936–2015), Holocaust
Carlo Ginzburg (born 1939), social history
Jan Glete (1947–2009), Swedish
Eric F. Goldman (1916–1989), 20th-century US
James Goldrick (born 1958), Australian
Adrian Goldsworthy (born 1969), ancient history
David Hamilton Golland (born 1971), 20th-century US civil rights, public policy, labor
Guillermo Gómez (born 1936), Philippine history
Brison D. Gooch (1925–2014), 19th century Europe
Ruth Goodman (born 1963), early modern period
Doris Kearns Goodwin (born 1943), US presidential
Andrew Gordon (born 1951), British naval history
Svetlana Gorshenina (born 1969), Central Asian history
 Lewis L. Gould (born 1939), US presidents and First Ladies
Gerald S. Graham (1903–1988), British imperial
Jack Granatstein (born 1939), Canada
Michael Grant (1914–2004), ancient
Abigail Green British historian of modern Europe
Peter Green (born 1924), ancient
Vivian H.H. Green (1915–2005), Christianity
John Robert Greene (born 1955), US presidency
Roger D. Griffin (born 1948), fascism, political and religious fanaticism 
Ramachandra Guha (born 1958), India, environment
Ranajit Guha (born 1923), Indian
Lev Gumilyov (1912–1992), Soviet
Oliver Gurney (1911–2001), Assyria, Hittites
John Guy (born 1949), Tudor England

H
Irfan Habib (born 1931), India
Sheldon Hackney (1933–2013), US South
Kenneth J. Hagan (born 1936), US naval
John Whitney Hall (1916–1997), Japan
Bruce Barrymore Halpenny (1937–2015), World War II air war
N. G. L. Hammond (1907–2001), ancient Greek history
Victor Davis Hanson (born 1953), ancient warfare
Syed Nomanul Haq (born 1948), history and philosophy of science
Yuval Noah Harari (born 1976), Israeli, military, Medieval, prehistorical
Antoinette Harrell (born 1960), post-slavery peonage of African-American sharecroppers
Dick Harrison (born 1966), Swedish and Medieval
Peter Harrison (born 1955), early modern intellectual
Max Hastings (born 1945), military, WWII 
John Hattendorf (born 1941), maritime
Ragnhild Hatton (1913–1995), 17th–18th-century European international
Denys Hay (1915–1994), medieval and Renaissance Europe
John Daniel Hayes (1902–1991), US naval
Peter Hayes (born c. 1947), Holocaust
Joel Hayward (born 1964), Islamic, maritime, military
Ingo Heidbrink (born 1968), maritime history, history of technology
Klaus Hentschel (born 1961), historian of science and of visual cultures
Ulrich Herbert (born 1951), modern Germany 
Jeffrey Herf (born 1947), Germany, Europe
Arthur L. Herman (born 1956), America, Britain
Michael Hicks (born 1948), late medieval England
Raul Hilberg (1926–2007), Holocaust
Klaus Hildebrand (born 1941), 19th/20th-century Germany
Christopher Hill (1912–2003), 17th-century England
Andreas Hillgruber (1925–1989), 20th-century Germany
Richard L. Hills (1936–2019), technology
Rodney Hilton (1916–2002), late medieval period
Gertrude Himmelfarb (1922–2019), Britain
Harry Hinsley (1918–1998), British intelligence, World War II
Gerhard Hirschfeld (born 1946), 20th-century Germany, World War I, World War II
Eric Hobsbawm (1917–2012), labour; Marxism
Marshall Hodgson (1922–1968), Islamic
Peter Hoffmann (born 1930), National Socialism
Richard Hofstadter (1916–1970), US political
David Hoggan (1923–1988), neo-Nazi
Hajo Holborn (1902–1969), Germany
Tom Holland (born 1968), Ancient Greece, Rome, Middle Ages
C. Warren Hollister (1930–1997), Middle Ages
George Holmes (1927–2009), medieval
Richard Holmes (1946–2011), military
Ed Hooper (born 1964), Southern Appalachia, Tennessee, Old South
A. G. Hopkins (born 1938), Britain
Keith Hopkins (1934–2004), ancient
Michiel Horn (born 1939), Canada
Alistair Horne (1925–2017), modern French
Daniel Horowitz (born 1954), US cultural
Helen Lefkowitz Horowitz (born 1942), women
Albert Hourani (1915–1993), Middle Eastern
Youssef Hourany (1931–2019), Lebanon, ancient
Michael Howard (1922–2019), military
Robert Hughes (1938–2012), Australia, cities
Marnie Hughes-Warrington (born 1970), historiography, philosophy of history
Andrew Hunt (born 1968), Cold War America
Tristram Hunt (born 1974)
Mark C. Hunter (born 1974), naval

I
Georg Iggers (1926-2017), Germany, Historiography 
Halil Inalcik (1916–2016), Ottoman Empire
Jonathan Israel (born 1946), Netherlands, Enlightenment, Jewry

J
Eberhard Jäckel (1929–2017), Nazi Germany
John Archibald Getty (born 1950)
Julian T. Jackson (born 1954), French
C. L. R. James (1862–1935), Trinidad/England
Harold James (born 1956), modern Germany
Nikoloz Janashia (1931–1982), Georgia and Caucasus
Simon Janashia (1900–1947), Georgia and Caucasus
Marius Jansen (1922–2000), Japan
Pawel Jasienica (1909–1970), Poland
 Rhodri Jeffreys-Jones (born 1942), US intelligence
Merrill Jensen (1905–1980), American Revolution
Richard J. Jensen (born 1941), America
Khasnor Johan (living), Malaysian historian
Paul Johnson (born 1928), Britain, Western civilization
Robert Erwin Johnson (1923–2008), US naval
Mauno Jokipii (1924–2007), Finnish, World War II
A. H. M. Jones (1904–1970), later Roman Empire
George Hilton Jones III (1924–2008), England
Gwyn Jones (1907–1999), medieval
Loe de Jong (1914–2005), Netherlands
Tony Judt (1948–2010), 20th-century European, postwar

K
Donald Kagan (1932–2021), ancient Greek
Michel Kaplan (born 1946), French Byzantinist
David S. Katz (born 1953), early modern England
Elie Kedourie (1926–1992), Middle East
Rod Kedward (born 1937), 20th-century France
John Keegan (1934–2012), military
John H. Kemble (1912–1990), US maritime
Paul Murray Kendall (1911–1973), late Middle Ages
Elizabeth Topham Kennan (born 1938), medieval
George F. Kennan (1904–2005), US–Soviet relations
James Kennedy (born 1963), Netherlands
Paul Kennedy (born 1945), world, military
W. Hudson Kensel (1928–2014), western America
Ian Kershaw (born 1943), Nazi Germany, Hitler
Daniel J. Kevles (born 1939), science
Khan Roshan Khan (1914–1988), Pakistan
Khoo Kay Kim (1937–2019), Malaysia
Kim Jung-bae (born 1940), Korea
Michael King (1945–2004), New Zealand
Patrick Kinross (1904–1976), Ottoman Empire
Henry Kissinger (born 1923), 19th-century Europe; late 20th-century 
Martin Kitchen (born 1936), modern Europe
Simon Kitson (born c. 1967), Vichy France
Klemens von Klemperer (1916–2012), Germany
Matti Klinge (born 1936), Finnish
Felix Klos (born 1992), American/Dutch, Modern European
R.J.B. Knight (born 1944), British naval
Yuri Knorozov (1922–1999), historical linguist
Eberhard Kolb (born 1933), German
Gabriel Kolko (1932–2014), US
Claudia Koonz (born 1940), Nazi Germany
Andrey Korotayev (born 1961), economic, Near East, Islamic and pre-Islamic
Ernst Kossmann (1922–2003), Low Countries
Philip A. Kuhn (1933–2016), China
Thomas Kuhn (1922–1996), science
Myoma Myint Kywe (1960–2021), Burmese writer and historian

L
Benjamin Woods Labaree (1927–2021), US colonial and maritime
Leopold Labedz (1920–1993), Soviet
Walter LaFeber (1933–2021), diplomatic, Cold War
Brij Lal (1952–2021), Fiji
K. S. Lal (1920–2002), Medieval India
Andrew Lambert (born 1956), British naval
Peter Lampe (born 1954), Hellenistic and late antiquity
Ricardo Lancaster-Jones y Verea (1905–1983), haciendas in Western Mexico
Dieter Langewiesche (born 1943), 19th–20th century, nationalism and liberalism
Abdallah Laroui (born 1933), Maghreb
David Lavender (1910–2003), American West
Jacques Le Goff (1924–2014), medieval
Emmanuel Le Roy Ladurie (born 1929), French
Daniel Leab (1936–2016), 20th century
Robert Leckie (1920–2001), US military
Ulrich L. Lehner (born 1976), intellectual and cultural history
Lee Ki-baek (1924–2004), Korean
William Leuchtenburg (born 1922), US political and legal
Barbara Levick (born 1931), Roman emperors
Bernard Lewis (1916–2018), Oriental studies
David Levering Lewis (born 1936), African American, Harlem Renaissance
Li Ao (1935–2018), Chinese
Leon F. Litwack (1929–2021), America, African-American
Xinru Liu (born 1951), Ancient Indian and Chinese
Mario Liverani (born 1939), ancient Middle East
David Loades (1934–2016), Tudor England
Roger Lockyer (1927–2017), Stuart England
James W. Loewen (1942–2021), America
Elizabeth Longford (1906–2002), Victorian England
Erik Lönnroth (1910–2002), Scandinavia
Walter Lord (1917–2002), America
John Lukacs (1924–2019), modern Europe

M
Joseph A. McCartin (born 1959), American labor 
Charles B. MacDonald (1922–1990), World War II
Stuart Macintyre (1947–2021), Australia
Piers Mackesy (1924–2014), British military
Margaret MacMillan (born 1943), 20th-century international relations
William Miller Macmillan (1885–1974), liberal South African historiography
Ramsay MacMullen (1928–2022), Roman
Heidrun E. Mader (born 1977), 2nd cent BCE - 2nd cent CE
Magnus Magnusson (1929–2007), Norse
Charles S. Maier (born 1939), 20th-century Europe
Paul L. Maier (born 1930), ancient history
Pauline Maier (1938–2013), early America
Leonard Maltin (born 1950), film
William Manchester (1922–2004), Churchill
Golo Mann (1909–1994), general
Susan Mann (born 1941), Canadian
Susan L. Mann (born 1943), history of China and women
Adel Manna (born 1947), Palestine in Ottoman period
María Emma Mannarelli (born 1954), social
Philip Mansel (born 1951), France, Ottoman Empire
Arthur Marder (1910–1980), British naval
Michael Marrus (1941–2022), French and Jewish
Rev. F.X. Martin (1922–2000), Irish medievalist and campaigner
Henri-Jean Martin (1924–2007), the Book
Luis Martínez-Fernández (born 1960), Cuba, the Caribbean
Laurence Marvin (living), US, French medievalist
Ezequiel González Mas (1919–2007), Spanish literature
Timothy Mason (1940–1990), Nazi Germany
Garrett Mattingly (1900–1962), early modern Europe
Ernest R. May (1928–2009), 20th-century warfare and international relations
Richard J. Maybury (born 1946), America, World War I, World War II, Middle East
Arno J. Mayer (born 1926), World War I and Europe
Mark Mazower (born 1958), Balkans, Greece
David McCullough (1933–2022), US
Forrest McDonald (1927–2016), early national America, presidency, business
K. B. McFarlane (1903–1966), English medievalist
William S. McFeely (1930–2019), American Civil War
Maurie McInnis (born 1966), Antebellum art and politics
W. David McIntyre (1932–2022), Commonwealth, New Zealand
Neil McKendrick (born 1935), modern economic and social history
Ross McKibbin (born 1942), 20th-century Britain
Rosamond McKitterick (born 1949), medieval
William McNeill (1917–2016), world
James M. McPherson (born 1936), American Civil War
Jon Meacham (born 1969), US presidency
D. W. Meinig (1924–2020), US geography
Evaldo Cabral de Mello (born 1936), Dutch Brazil
Russell Menard (living), colonial American
Thomas C. Mendenhall (1910–1998), history of sport
Josef W. Meri (born 1969), Islamic world, Jews
John M. Merriman(1946–2022), France 
Barbara Metcalf (born 1941), India
Rade Mihaljčić (1937–2020), medieval Serbia
Perry Miller (1905–1963), US intellectual
Giles Milton (born 1966), exploration
Zora Mintalová – Zubercová (born 1950), food history and material culture of Central Europe
 Steven Mintz (born 1953), US family
Yagutil Mishiev (born 1927), Derbent, Dagestan, Russia
Hans Mommsen (1930–2015), Germany
Wolfgang Mommsen (1930–2004), Britain, Germany
Indro Montanelli (1909–2001) general
Simon Sebag Montefiore (born 1965), Russia, Middle East
Theodore William Moody (1907–1984), Ireland
Edmund Morgan (1916–2013), American colonial and Revolution
Kenneth O. Morgan (born 1934), British politics, Wales
William J. Morgan (1917–2003), US naval
Samuel Eliot Morison (1887–1976), US colonial and naval
Benny Morris (born 1948), Middle East
Ian Mortimer (born 1967), Middle Ages
W.L. Morton (1908–1980), Canada 
George Mosse (1918–1999), German, Jewish, fascist, sexual
Roland Mousnier (1907–1993), early modern France
Mubarak Ali (born 1941), Pakistan

N
Joseph Needham (1900–1995), Chinese science and technology
Mark E. Neely Jr. (born 1944), American Civil War 
Malcolm Neesam (1946–2022), history of Harrogate, North Yorkshire, England
Cynthia Neville (living), late medieval, Scotland and England, Gaelic culture
Thomas Nipperdey (1927–1992), 19th c. German history
Ernst Nolte (1923–2016), German, fascism and communism

O
Josiah Ober (living), ancient Greece
Heiko Oberman (1930–2001), Reformation
Ambeth Ocampo (born 1961), Philippines
W. H. Oliver (1925–2015), New Zealand
Robin O'Neil (living), Holocaust
Vincent Orange (1935–2012), military, World War II, aviation
Michael Oren (born 1955), modern Middle East
Margaret Ormsby (1909–1996), Canada
İlber Ortaylı (born 1947), Turkey
Fernand Ouellet (1926–2021), French Canada
Richard Overy (born 1947), World War II
Steven Ozment (1939–2019), Germany

P
Thomas Pakenham (born 1933), Africa
Madhavan K. Palat (born 1947), Russia and Europe
Ilan Pappé (born 1954), Israel
Peter Paret (1924–2020), military
Geoffrey Parker (born 1943), early modern military
Simo Parpola (born 1943), ancient Middle East
J. H. Parry (1914–1982), maritime
T. T. Paterson (1909–1994), archaeologist and sociologist
Fred Patten (1940–2018), science fiction
Stanley G. Payne (born 1934), Spain, fascism
Abel Paz (1921–2009), Spanish anarchist
William Armstrong Percy (1933–2022), Medieval Europe and ancient Greek and Roman, homosexuality
Bradford Perkins (1925–2008), US diplomatic
Detlev Peukert (1950–1990), everyday life in Weimar and Nazi eras
John Edward Philips (born 1952), Africa 
Liza Picard (1927–2022), London
William B. Pickett (born 1940), US history, Dwight D. Eisenhower
David Pietrusza (born 1949), US
Boris B. Piotrovsky (1908–1990), Urartu, Scythia
Richard Pipes (1923–2018), Russian and Soviet
J.H. Plumb (1911–2001), 18th-century Britain
J. G. A. Pocock (born 1924), early modern intellectual
Kwok Kin Poon (born 1949), Chinese Southern and Northern Dynasties
Barbara Corrado Pope (born 1941), America, Belle Époque, women's studies
Roy Porter (1946–2002), medicine, British social and cultural
Norman Pounds (1912–2006), geography and England
Caio Prado Júnior (1907–1990), Brazil
Gordon W. Prange (1910–1980), World War II Pacific
Joshua Prawer (1917–1990), Crusades
Michael Prestwich (born 1943), medieval England
Clement Alexander Price (1945–2014), America
Francis Paul Prucha (1921–2015), American Indians 
Janko Prunk (born 1942), Slovenia
Alenka Puhar (born 1945), Slovenia

Q
Carroll Quigley (1910–1977), classical, western history, theorist of civilizations

R
Marc Raeff (1923–2008), Russian Empire
Alexander Rabinowitch (born 1934), Russia
Werner Rahn (1939–2022), German naval
Jack N. Rakove (born 1947), U.S. Constitution and early politics
Šerbo Rastoder (living), Montenegrin
Robert V. Remini (1921–2013), Jacksonian U.S.
René Rémond (1918–2007), French politics
Timothy Reuter (1947–2002), Medieval Germany
Ofelia Rey Castelao (born 1956), Spanish Galician women 
Henry A. Reynolds (born 1938), Australia
Susan Reynolds (1929–2021), medieval
Richard Rhodes (born 1937), World War II, hydrogen bomb
Nicholas V. Riasanovsky (1923–2011), Russia
Darcy Ribeiro (1922–1997), Brazil
Jonathan Riley-Smith (1938–2016), Crusades
Blaze Ristovski (1931–2018), Macedonia
Charles Ritcheson (1925–2011), Anglo-US relations 1775–1815
Gerhard A. Ritter (1929–2015), Germany
Andrew Roberts (born 1963), Britain
J. M. Roberts (1928–2003), Europe
Nicholas A. M. Rodger (born 1949), British naval
William Ledyard Rodgers (1860–1944), ancient naval
Walter Rodney (1942–1980), Guyana
Theodore Ropp (1911–2000), military
W. J. Rorabaugh (1945–2020), 19th and 20th-century US
Ron Rosenbaum (born 1946), Hitler
Charles E. Rosenberg (born 1936), medicine and science
Stephen Roskill (1903–1982), British naval
Maarten van Rossem (born 1943), 20th-century US
María Rostworowski (1915–2016), Peruvian
Constance Rover (1910–2005), feminism
Sheila Rowbotham (born 1943), feminism, socialism
Herbert H. Rowen (1916–1999), Netherlands
A. L. Rowse (1903–1997), English
Miri Rubin (born 1956), social, Europe 1100–1600
George Rudé (1910–1993), French revolution
Robert W. Thurston (born 1949)
R. J. Rummel (1932–2014), genocide
Steven Runciman (1903–2000), Crusades
Leila J. Rupp (born 1950), feminist
Conrad Russell, 5th Earl Russell (1937–2004), 17th-century Britain
Cornelius Ryan (1920–1974), World War II, popular
Boris Rybakov (1908–2001), Soviet

S
Edgar V. Saks (1910–1984), Estonia
Dominic Sandbrook (born 1974), recent Britain and America
Usha Sanyal (living), Asian, Islam, Sufism
S. Srikanta Sastri (1904–1974), Indian
Simon Schama (born 1945), British, Dutch, US, French
Arthur Schlesinger, Jr. (1917–2007), Andrew Jackson, New Deal, politics
Jean-Claude Schmitt (born 1946), Middle Ages
David Schoenbaum (born 1935), modern German and US–Israeli relations
Carl Emil Schorske (1915–2015), Vienna, Modernism, intellectual
Paul W. Schroeder (1927–2020), European diplomacy
D. M. Schurman (1924–2013), British imperial and naval
Karl Schweizer (living), 18th-century European
Dorothy Schwieder, (1933–2014), Iowa
Joan Scott (born 1941), feminism
William Henry Scott (1921–1993), Philippines
Howard Hayes Scullard (1903–1983), ancient
Jules Sedney (1922–2020), Surinamese historian and former prime minister
Tom Segev (born 1945), Israeli
Lorelle D. Semley (born 1969), US historian of Africa
Robert Service (born 1947), Soviet, Russian
Dasharatha Sharma (1903–1976), Rajasthan
Ram Sharan Sharma (1919–2011), ancient India
James J. Sheehan (born 1937), modern Germany
Michael S. Sherry (born 1945), 20c American military; LGBTQ
William L. Shirer (1904–1993), 20c Europe, Third Reich
He Shu (born 1948), Chinese cultural revolution
Jack Simmons (1915–2000), English historian, railway history
Keith Sinclair (1922–1993), New Zealand
Helene J. Sinnreich (born 1975), Holocaust
Nathan Sivin (1931–2022), China
Quentin Skinner (born 1940), early modern Britain
Alexandre Skirda (1942–2020), Russia
Theda Skocpol (born 1947), institutions and comparative method; sociological
Richard Slotkin (born 1942), US environment and West
Cornelius Cole Smith, Jr. (1913–2004), military history, American Old West
Digby Smith (born 1935), military
Henry Nash Smith (1906–1986), US cultural
Jean Edward Smith (1932–2019), US foreign policy, constitutional law, biography
Page Smith (1917–1995), U.S.
Richard Norton Smith (born 1953), US presidential
T. C. Smout (born 1933), Scottish environmental and social
John Smolenski, (born 1973), American colonial period
Louis Leo Snyder (1907–1993), German nationalism
Timothy D. Snyder (born 1969), Eastern Europe
Albert Soboul (1913–1982), French revolution
Aleksandr Solzhenitsyn (1918–2008), Russian Gulag
Pat Southern (born 1948), ancient Rome
R. W. Southern (1912–2001), medieval
E. Lee Spence (born 1947), shipwrecks
Jonathan Spence (1936–2021), China
Jonathan Sperber (born 1952), US historian of Europe.
Jackson J. Spielvogel (born 1939), world
Kenneth Stampp (1912–2009), U.S. South, slavery
George Stanley (1907–2002), Canada
David Starkey (born 1945), Tudor
Leften Stavros Stavrianos (1913—2004), world
James M. Stayer (born 1935), German Reformation
Valerie Steele (born 1955), fashion
Jonathan Steinberg (1934–2021), US historian of Germany 
Jean Stengers (1922–2002), Belgian
Fritz Stern (1926–2016), Germany and Jewish
Zeev Sternhell (1935–2020), fascism
William N. Still, Jr. (born 1932), US naval 
Dan Stone (living), recent Europe
Lawrence Stone (1919–1999), early modern British social, economic and family
Norman Stone (1941–2019), military
Hew Strachan (born 1949), military
Barry S. Strauss (born 1953), ancient military
Michael Stürmer (born 1938), modern German
Ronald Suleski (born 1942), China
Viktor Suvorov (born 1947), Soviet
Ronald Syme (1903–1989), ancient
David Syrett (1939–2004), British naval

T
Ronald Takaki (1939–2009), America, ethnic studies
J. L. Talmon (1916–1980), Modern, The Origins of Totalitarian DemocracyAlasdair and Hettie Tayler (1870–1937/1869–1951), Scotland
A. J. P. Taylor (1906–1990), Britain, modern Europe
Abdelhadi Tazi (1921–2015), Moroccan
Antonio Tellez (1921–2005), Spanish Anarchism, anti-fascist resistance
Harold Temperley (1879–1939), 19th and early 20th-century diplomacy
Romila Thapar (born 1931), ancient India
Françoise Thébaud (born 1952), history of women
Stephan Thernstrom (born 1934), US ethnic
Barbara Thiering (1930–2015), Biblical
Joan Thirsk (1922–2013), agriculture
Hugh Thomas (1931–2017), Spanish Civil War, Atlantic slave trade
Keith Thomas (born 1933), early modern Britain, culture
E. P. Thompson (1924–1993), British labor history
Mark Thompson (born 1959), Balkans, World War I Italy
Carl L. Thunberg (born 1963), Viking Age, Middle Ages
 Charles Tilly (1929–2008), Modern Europe; politics and society
 Louise A. Tilly (1930–2018), modern Europe; women, family
John Toland (1912–2004), World War I and World War II
K. Ross Toole (1920–1981), Montana
Ahmed Toufiq (born 1943), Moroccan
Marc Trachtenberg (born 1946), Cold War
Hugh Trevor-Roper (1914–2003), Nazi; British
Gil Troy (born 1961), modern US, the Presidency
Barbara Tuchman (1912–1989), 20th-century military
Robert C. Tucker (1918–2010), Stalin
Peter Turchin (born 1957), Russian historian of historical dynamics
Henry Ashby Turner, Jr. (1932–2008), 20th-century German
Denis Twitchett (1925–2006), China
David Tyack (1930–2016), US education

U
Walter Ullmann (1910–1983), medieval
Laurel Thatcher Ulrich (born 1938), early America
David Underdown (1925–2009), 17th-century England
Mladen Urem (born 1964), Croatian literary
Robert M. Utley (1929–2022), 19th-century US West

V
Hans van de Ven (born 1958), Britain, modern China
Frank Vandiver (1925–2005), US Civil War
Jan Vansina (1929–2017), Belgian; African history
Jean-Pierre Vernant (1914–2007), French, ancient Greece
Paul Veyne (1930–2022), French, ancient Greece and Rome
César Vidal Manzanares (born 1958), Spanish
Pierre Vidal-Naquet (1930–2006), French, ancient Greece, civil rights activist
Richard Vinen (living), British
Jaime Vicens Vives (1910–1960), Spain 
Andrekos Varnava (born 1979), Australia, modern history

W
John Waiko (born 1944), Papua New Guinea
J. Samuel Walker (living), nuclear energy and weapons
Immanuel Wallerstein (1930–2019), world-systems theory
Retha Warnicke (born 1939), Tudor and gender issues
Peter Watson (born 1943), intellectual history
Eugen Weber (1925–2007), modern French
Emma Jane Wells (born 1986), church history
Cicely Veronica Wedgwood (1910–1997), 16th and 17th-century Europe
Hans-Ulrich Wehler (1931–2014), 19th-century German social
Russell Weigley (1930–2004), military
Gerhard Weinberg (born 1928), Germany, World War II
Roberto Weiss (1906–1969), Renaissance
Frank Welsh (born 1931), British imperial
Christopher Whatley (living), Scotland
John Wheeler-Bennett (1902–1975), Germany
John Whyte (1928–1990), Northern Ireland, divided societies
Christopher Wickham (born 1950), medieval
 Robert H. Wiebe (1930–2000), American business and society
Toby Wilkinson (born 1969), ancient Egypt
Eric Williams (1911–1981), Guiana, Caribbean
Glanmor Williams (1920–2005), Wales
Glyndwr Williams (1932–2022), exploration
William Appleman Williams (1921–1990), US diplomacy
John Willingham (born 1946), Texas
Andrew Wilson (born 1961), Ukraine
Clyde N. Wilson (born 1941), 19th-century US South
Ian Wilson (born 1941), religious
Keith Windschuttle (born 1942), Australia; historiography
Henry Winkler (born 1938), German
Robert S. Wistrich (1945–2015), Anti-Semitism, Holocaust, Jews
John B. Wolf (1907–1996), French
Michael Wolffsohn (born 1947), German Jewish
Herwig Wolfram (born 1934), medieval
Gordon S. Wood (born 1933), American Revolution
Michael Wood (born 1948), England
Thomas Woods (born 1972), America, conservatism
C. Vann Woodward (1908–1999), American South
Daniel Woolf (born 1958), Britain, historiography
Lucy Worsley (born 1973), Britain
Gordon Wright (1912–2000), modern France
Lawrence C. Wroth (1884–1970), US printing

Y
Yen Ching-hwang (顏清湟, born 1937), writer, works on Overseas Chinese history
Robert J. Young (born 1942), French Third Republic
Robert M. Young (1935–2019), medicine

Z
Gregorio F. Zaide (1907–1986), Philippines
Adam Zamoyski (born 1949), Napoleonic era
Anna Żarnowska (1931–2007), Polish historian
Alfred-Maurice de Zayas (born 1947), German
Howard Zinn (1922–2010), US
Rainer Zitelmann (born 1957), German
Marek Żukow-Karczewski (born 1961), Poland, Kraków

See also
General
Historiography
Historiography of the British Empire
Historiography of the United Kingdom
Historiography of Canada
Historiography of China
Historiography of the French Revolution
Historiography of Germany
Historiography of the United States
Historiography of World War II
History
List of history journals

Lists of historians
Area of study
Canadian
England (Middle Ages)
French
Revolution
Contemporary
Greek
Irish
Jewish
Russian

References

BibliographyThe American Historical Association's Guide to Historical Literature, ed. by Mary Beth Norton and Pamela Gerardi (3rd ed. 2 vol, Oxford UP, 1995), 2064 pages; annotated guide to 27,000 of the most important English language history books in all fields and topics vol 1 online, vol 2 online
Allison, William Henry et al. eds. A guide to historical literature (1931), comprehensive bibliography for scholarship to 1930 as selected by scholars from the American Historical Association online edition
Barnes, Harry Elmer. A history of historical writing (1962)
Barnes, Harry Elmer. History, its rise and development: a survey of the progress of historical writing from its origins to the present day (1922), online
Barraclough, Geoffrey. History: Main Trends of Research in the Social and Human Sciences, (1978)
Bentley, Michael. ed., Companion to Historiography, Routledge, 1997, ; 39 chapters by experts
; detailed coverage of historians and major themes
Breisach, Ernst. Historiography: Ancient, Medieval and Modern, 3rd edition, 2007, 
Elton, G. R. Modern Historians on British History 1485–1945: A Critical Bibliography 1945–1969 (1969), annotated guide to 1000 history books on every major topic, plus book reviews and major scholarly articles. online
Gilderhus, Mark T. History and Historians: A Historiographical Introduction, 2002, 
Gooch, G. P. History and historians in the nineteenth century (1913), online
Iggers, Georg G. Historiography in the 20th Century: From Scientific Objectivity to the Postmodern Challenge (2005)
Kramer, Lloyd, and Sarah Maza, eds. A Companion to Western Historical Thought Blackwell 2006. 520pp; 
Momigliano, Arnaldo. The Classical Foundation of Modern Historiography, 1990, 
Rahman, M. M. ed. Encyclopaedia of Historiography (2006), Excerpt and text search
E. Sreedharan, A Textbook of Historiography, 500 B.C. to A.D. 2000 (2004)
Thompson, James, and Bernard J. Holm. A History of Historical Writing: Volume I: From the Earliest Times to the End of the Seventeenth Century (2nd ed. 1967), 678 pp.; A History of Historical Writing: Volume II: The Eighteenth and Nineteenth Centuries (2nd ed. 1967), 676 pp.vol 1 of 1942 first edition; vol 2 of 1942 first edition; highly detailed coverage of European writers to 1900
Woolf, D. R. A Global Encyclopedia of Historical Writing (Garland Reference Library of the Humanities) (2 vols. 1998), excerpt and text search
Woolf, Daniel, et al. The Oxford History of Historical Writing'' (5 vol 2011–12), covers all major historians since ancient times to present; see vol 1

External links
"Making History", covering British historians and institutions from Institute of Historical Research

Historians
 
History